Albert Frits Ruimschotel (February 28, 1922 in Pangkal Pinang, Dutch East Indies – May 28, 1987 in Utrecht) was a Dutch water polo player who competed in the 1948 Summer Olympics.

He was part of the Dutch team which won the bronze medal. He played all seven matches.

See also
 List of Olympic medalists in water polo (men)

External links
 

1922 births
1987 deaths
Dutch male water polo players
Olympic bronze medalists for the Netherlands
Olympic medalists in water polo
Olympic water polo players of the Netherlands
Water polo players at the 1948 Summer Olympics
Medalists at the 1948 Summer Olympics
People from Pangkal Pinang
Dutch people of the Dutch East Indies
20th-century Dutch people
20th-century Dutch East Indies people